Kiriakoffalia costimacula is a moth of the family Erebidae. It was described by James John Joicey and George Talbot in 1924. It is found in the Democratic Republic of the Congo, Kenya, Rwanda and Uganda.

References

 

Spilosomina
Moths described in 1924